Zaboršt is a settlement on the left bank of the Kamnik Bistrica River on the outskirts of Domžale in the Upper Carniola region of Slovenia.

References

External links

Zaboršt on Geopedia

Populated places in the Municipality of Domžale